Government College, Munnar, is a general degree college located in Munnar, Idukki district, Kerala. It was established in the year 1995. The college is affiliated with Mahatma Gandhi University. This college offers different courses in arts, commerce and science.

Departments

Tamil
Mathematics
Economics
Commerce

Accreditation
The college is  recognized by the University Grants Commission (UGC).

References

External links

Universities and colleges in Idukki district
Educational institutions established in 1995
1995 establishments in Kerala
Arts and Science colleges in Kerala
Colleges affiliated to Mahatma Gandhi University, Kerala
Munnar